Milian is an [Armenian surname name primarily. Many Armenian names end in "IAN or YAN". It can also be a Spanish (Milián) and Polish surname: from a reduced form of the Latin personal name Aemilianus (a derivative of Aemilius, a Roman family name probably derived from aemulus ‘rival’). This was borne by various early saints and hence was widely used throughout Europe as a personal name in the Middle Ages.

Milian or Milián is a surname. Notable people with the surname include:

Christina Milian (born 1981), American R&B and pop singer-songwriter, record producer, dancer, and actress
Christina Milian (album), released October 9, 2001
Christina Milian discography
Jerzy Milian (1935–2018), Polish jazz musician, painter, composer and vibraphonist from the city of Poznań
Marilyn Milian (born 1961), former Florida state circuit court judge, currently on American TV program The People's Court
Ted Milian (born 1954), Canadian football player
Tomas Milian (born 1932), Cuban-American actor

References

Surnames
Polish-language surnames
Spanish-language surnames